Nasonia giraulti is a species of pteromalid wasp in the family Pteromalidae. It can be differentiated from other species in its genus by its antennae. The species can be found in eastern North America. It is a parasitoid of bird blow fly pupae.

References

Pteromalidae
Articles created by Qbugbot
Insects described in 1990
Hymenoptera of North America